Gahnia radula, commonly known as the thatch saw-sedge is a tufted perennial sedge native to south-eastern Australia.  The leaves are long, flat and rough, with sharp edges.  It has a distinctive brown inflorescence, which darkens to black.  It grows to 50–100 cm in height, spreads through its rhizomes and is found in eucalypt forest and grassy woodland.

References

radula
Flora of New South Wales
Flora of South Australia
Flora of Victoria (Australia)
Flora of Tasmania
Poales of Australia
Plants described in 1810
Taxa named by George Bentham
Taxa named by Robert Brown (botanist, born 1773)